Tavita Pritchard (born February 20, 1987) is an American football coach who is the quarterbacks coach for the Washington Commanders. He played college football for the Stanford Cardinal, where he was also an assistant coach from 2010 to 2022.

High school career
Pritchard graduated from Clover Park High School in Lakewood, Washington, where he threw for 5,323 yards and 55 touchdowns in his high school career.

College career
Pritchard received his first start at Stanford in 2007 against top-ranked USC, after starter T. C. Ostrander suffered a seizure the week before. Though Stanford was a 41-point underdog, Pritchard led Stanford to an improbable 24–23 victory and earned the starting job.

Pritchard was replaced as the starting quarterback by redshirt freshman Andrew Luck during the 2009 season. After Luck injured a finger on his throwing hand and had surgery prior to the 2009 Sun Bowl, Pritchard started the game for the Cardinal. He went 8 for 19 for 118 yards and two interceptions in the 31–27 loss to Oklahoma. Pritchard went undrafted in the 2010 NFL Draft. In May, he participated in a rookie minicamp with the San Francisco 49ers, but was not offered a contract.

Coaching career

Stanford 
Pritchard worked as a volunteer assistant for the Stanford football team in 2010, and in 2011, was hired as a defensive assistant football coach at Stanford by new head football coach David Shaw. In January 2013, Pritchard was elevated to the role of running backs coach. In December 2013, he was promoted to quarterbacks and wide receivers coach, succeeding Mike Sanford. In December 2017, Pritchard was promoted to offensive coordinator when Mike Bloomgren left to become head coach at Rice.

Washington Commanders 
Pritchard joined the Washington Commanders as a quarterbacks coach in February 2023.

Personal
Pritchard's father David was a starting center at Washington State in 1981 and an uncle is former NFL quarterback Jack "The Throwin' Samoan" Thompson.  He is third in a family of eleven children. He grew up in Centralia, Washington and his freshman year he moved to Lakewood, Washington. He was a Communications major at Stanford and a member of the Delta Tau Delta fraternity.

References

External links
 
 Washington Commanders bio
 Stanford coaching bio
 Stanford player bio

1987 births
Living people
American football quarterbacks
Stanford Cardinal football players
Stanford Cardinal football coaches
Players of American football from Tacoma, Washington
American sportspeople of Samoan descent
People from Lakewood, Washington
Washington Commanders coaches